János Balogh (19 February 1913, Lonka, Austro-Hungarian Empire – 15 August 2002, Budapest) was a Hungarian zoologist, ecologist, and professor, a recipient of the Kossuth and Széchenyi Prizes, and member of the Hungarian Academy of Sciences. 

He specialized in arachnology, and made major contributions to the knowledge of spiders and oribatid mites, as well as zoocenology, the study of animal communities.

References

János Balogh Commemorial Session Held at the Hungarian Academy of Sciences. Acta Zoologica Academiae Scientiarum Hungaricae, volume. 49, 2003. pp. 297-341

1913 births
2002 deaths
20th-century Hungarian zoologists
Arachnologists
Members of the Hungarian Academy of Sciences
Hungarian ecologists